Nationality words link to articles with information on the nation's poetry or literature (for instance, Irish or France).

Events

Works published in English

Australia
 Gün Gencer, General Poems: Australia facing the dawn and its result, published by the author, printed in Sydney by R.T. Kelly
 Allen Gilfillen, A Day, Melbourne: Melville and Mullen, drama and poetry
 Lilian Wooster Greaves, Poems by Lilian, Newtown, New South Wales: G. Baker Walker
 Bernard O'Dowd, Dawnward?, Australia
 Banjo Paterson, "Waltzing Matilda", Australia's most widely known bush ballad

Canada
 Bliss Carman, From the Green Book of Bards
 E. Pauline Johnson, also known as "Tekahionwake", Canadian Born
 Charles G. D. Roberts, The Book of the Rose

United Kingdom
 Robert Bridges, Now in Wintry Delights
 Anne Finch, Countess of Winchilsea (died 1720), The Poems of Anne, Countess of Winchilsea, edited by Myra Reynolds
 W. E. Henley, A Song of Speed
 Rudyard Kipling, The Five Nations
 Thomas MacDonagh, April and May, Irish poet published in Ireland
 John Masefield, Ballads
 Alfred Noyes, The Flower of Old Japan
 'Æ' (George William Russell), The Nuts of Knowledge, lyrical poems old and new
 Thomas Traherne (died 1674), The Poetical Works of Thomas Traherne
 W. B. Yeats, Irish poet published in the United Kingdom:
 In the Seven Woods, being poems of the Irish heroic age including "Adam's Curse", "The King's Threshold" and "The Hour-Glass"
 Ideas of Good and Evil, essays, including essays on Edmund Spenser, Percy Shelley and William Blake (criticism)

United States
 Ambrose Bierce, Shapes of Clay
 Willa Cather, Shapes of Clay
 W. E. B. Du Bois, The Souls of Black Folk
 H. L. Mencken, Ventures into Verse
 Josephine Preston Peabody, The Singing Leaves
 George Sterling, The Testimony of the Suns
 J. T. Trowbridge, Poetical Works

Other in English
 Yone Noguchi, From the Eastern Sea
 N. W. Pai, The Angel of Misfortune: A Fairy Tale, A Metrical Romance in Ten Books, Bombay: W. N. Mulgaokar and Co.India, Indian poetry in English
 W. B. Yeats, Irish poet published in the United Kingdom:
 In the Seven Woods, being poems of the Irish heroic age including "Adam's Curse", "The King's Threshold" and "The Hour-Glass"
 Ideas of Good and Evil, essays, including essays on Edmund Spenser, Percy Shelley and William Blake (criticism)

Works published in other languages
Konstantin Balmont, Будем как Солнце (Budem kak Solntse), Russia
 Paul Claudel, Art poétique, criticism; France
 Kavi Dalpatram Nanalal, Katlank Kavyo, Indian, Gujarati-language
 Saint-Pol-Roux, pen name of Paul Roux, Anciennetés, France

Awards and honors

Births
Death years link to the corresponding "[year] in poetry" article:
 April 3 – Peter Huchel (died 1981), German poet
 May 25 – Ewart Milne (died 1987), Irish poet and radical
 May 30 – Countee Cullen (died 1946), African-American poet
 June 13 – Sanjayan, pen name of M. R. Nayar (died 1943), Indian, Malayalam-language poet
 June 17 – Jyoti Prasad Agarwala (died 1953), playwright, songwriter, poet, writer and film maker; Indian, writing in Assamese
 September 9 – Atul Chandra Hazarika (died 1986), poet, dramatist, children's story writer and translator; called "Sahitycharjya" by an Assamese literary society; Indian, writing in Assamese
 October 5 – Yaho Kitabatake 北畠 八穂 (died 1982), Japanese Shōwa period poet and children's fiction writer
 November 6 – Carl Rakosi, American poet
 November 15:
 Tatsuko Hoshino 星野立子 (died 1984), Japanese Shōwa period haiku poet and travel writer; founded Tamamo, a haiku magazine exclusively for women; in the Hototogisu literary circle; haiku selector for Asahi Shimbun newspaper; contributed to haiku columns in various newspapers and magazines (a woman)
 Jinzai Kiyoshi 神西清 (died 1957) Japanese Shōwa period novelist, translator, literary critic, poet and playwright
 December 4 – A. L. Rowse (died 1997), English poet, historian and Shakespeare scholar and biographer
 December 10 – William Plomer (died 1973),  South African-born novelist, poet and literary editor
 December 31:
 Fumiko Hayashi 林 芙美子 (born this year or 1904 (sources disagree); died 1951), Japanese novelist, writer and poet (a woman)
 Lorine Niedecker (died 1970) the only woman associated with the Objectivist poets
 Also:
 Raymond Herbert McGrath (died 1977), Australian poet
 Rafael Méndez Dorich (died 1973), Peruvian poet

Deaths

 March 20 – Charles Godfrey Leland, 78, American humorist, folklorist and poet
 May 8 – David Mills (born 1831), Canadian politician and poet
 May 22 – Misao Fujimura, 藤村操 (born 1886), Japanese philosophy student and poet, largely remembered for the poem he carved into a tree before committing suicide over an unrequited love; made famous by Japanese newspapers after his death (see picture at right)
 July 11 – W. E. Henley, 52, English poet, critic and editor
 October 30 – Ozaki Kōyō 尾崎 紅葉, pen name of Ozaki Tokutarō 尾崎 徳太郎 (born 1868), Japanese novelist, essayist and haiku poet
 December – Isa Craig (born 1831), Scottish-born poet

See also
 20th century in poetry
 20th century in literature
 List of years in poetry
 List of years in literature
 French literature of the 20th century
 Silver Age of Russian Poetry

 Young Poland (Młoda Polska) a modernist period in Polish  arts and literature, roughly from 1890 to 1918
 Poetry

Notes

Poetry

20th-century poetry